Long Mountain,  feet above sea level, is a traprock mountain of the Holyoke Range, part of the greater Metacomet Ridge which stretches from Long Island Sound to nearly the Vermont border. It is located within the towns of Amherst and Granby, Massachusetts. The  Metacomet-Monadnock Trail and the  Robert Frost Trail traverse the mountain. The Holyoke Range continues to the west as Mount Norwottuck and to the east as Harris Mountain.

Geology and ecology
Long Mountain, like much of the Metacomet Ridge, is composed of basalt, also called traprock, a volcanic rock. The mountain formed near the end of the Triassic Period with the rifting apart of the North American continent from Africa and Eurasia. Lava welled up from the rift and solidified into sheets of strata hundreds of feet thick. Subsequent faulting and earthquake activity tilted the strata, creating the steep ridge and talus slopes of Long Mountain. Hot, dry upper slopes, cool, moist ravines, and mineral-rich ledges of basalt talus produce a combination of microclimate ecosystems on the mountain that support plant and animal species uncommon in greater Massachusetts.

Recreation
Several trails are located on Long Mountain, most notably the  Metacomet-Monadnock Trail and the  Robert Frost Trail which share the same footway on the mountain. Several ledges near the summit provide views of greater Amherst region and the Fort River valley. Most of Long Mountain has been conserved as part of the Mount Holyoke Range State Park; local conservations commissions and private land holders own the remaining acreage. The nearest trailhead to the summit is located on Harris Mountain Road precisely as it crosses the Granby to Amherst boundary line.  This location can be accessed either via Bay Road in Amherst or Batchelor Street in Granby.  The trail leading to the west leads to the summit.

References
 The Metacomet-Monadnock Trail Guide. 9th Edition. The Appalachian Mountain Club. Amherst, Massachusetts, 1999.
 Farnsworth, Elizabeth J. "Metacomet-Mattabesett Trail Natural Resource Assessment." 2004. PDF file. Cited Nov. 20, 2007. 
 The Metacomet-Monadnock Trail Guide. 9th Edition. The Appalachian Mountain Club. Amherst, Massachusetts, 1999.
 Raymo, Chet and Raymo, Maureen E. Written in Stone: A Geologic History of the Northeastern United States. Globe Pequot, Chester, Connecticut, 1989.

External links
 Mount Holyoke Range State Park map
 Hampshire College mountain biking map of the Holyoke Range
 Berkshire Chapter of the Appalachian Mountain Club
 The Kestrel Trust
 The Valley Land Fund
 Friends of the Mount Holyoke Range
 Natural resource assessment of the Metacomet Ridge
 Geology of the northern Metacomet Ridge region

Mountains of Hampshire County, Massachusetts
Holyoke Range
Geography of Amherst, Massachusetts
Granby, Massachusetts